DSX may refer to:
 Demonstration and Science Experiments, a small satellite by the Air Force Research Laboratory
 Douala Stock Exchange
 DSX (Andromeda), a fictional type of starship in the television series Andromeda
 dsx, the doublesex gene in fruit flies
 Dongsha Airport, the airport code DSX